Maginness is a surname. Notable people with the surname include:

Alban Maginness (born 1950), Northern Ireland politician
Norm Maginness (born 1933), Australian rules footballer
Scott Maginness (born 1966), Australian rules footballer